Jonathan Weaver (February 23, 1824 – February 6, 1901) was a 19th-century bishop of the Church of the United Brethren in Christ, and employed by Otterbein College.

Early life
Weaver was born in Harrison Township, Carroll County, Ohio on February 23, 1824.  He was the youngest of twelve children, grew up on a farm, and attended public schools.  He converted at a camp meeting in 1841, when he was 17.

Career

In 1847, Weaver entered the Muskingum Conference.  In 1848 he was ordained by Bishop Glossbrenner.  In 1851 he was chosen presiding elder, and in 1857, he was a delegate to the General Conference at Cincinnati.  The trustees of Otterbein College hired him as soliciting agent, a post he served for eight years.  In 1861, the General Conference elected him bishop for the Pacific Coast.  He declined, preferring to stay with the college.

In 1865, Weaver campaigned to be editor of the Religious Telescope.  He lost election, but was instead selected by the General Conference to the office of bishop.  In matters of policy, he was a moderate, often refusing to take a public position, but he was better as a preacher and author.  

In 1893, age began to catch up with Weaver, and he was relieved of active duties, and elected bishop emeritus.  Weaver died February 6, 1901.

Publications

References

External links

1824 births
1901 deaths
American United Brethren in Christ
Arminian ministers
Arminian writers
Bishops in Ohio
Burials at Woodland Cemetery and Arboretum
Otterbein University
People from Carroll County, Ohio
People from Dayton, Ohio